Estrella Cabeza Candela was the defending champion, but chose not to participate.

Allie Kiick won the title, defeating Çağla Büyükakçay in the final, 7–6(7–3), 3–6, 6–1.

Seeds

Draw

Finals

Top half

Bottom half

References

Main Draw

Trofeu Internacional Ciutat de Barcelona - Singles